The Ramså Formation is a geologic formation in Norway. It preserves fossils dating back to the Jurassic period.

See also

 List of fossiliferous stratigraphic units in Norway

References
 

Jurassic Norway